The Evangelical Lutheran Church of Romania is a Lutheran denomination in Romania.  Many active congregations were founded over 450 years ago, and today the Church has 27,540 members. It is primarily a Hungarian-speaking denomination, with one deanery for Slovak-speaking parishes.

This church is not to be confused with the mainly Saxon, German-speaking Evangelical Church of the Augsburg Confession.

References

External links
 Official website 

Lutheranism in Romania
Lutheran World Federation members